Idealno tvoja (Ideally Yours) is the debut studio album by Bosnian-Serbian pop-folk recording artist Seka Aleksić. It was released 5 May 2002 through the record label Grand Production.

Track List
Opet (Again)
U kafani punoj dima (In a Kafana Full of Smoke)
Ne, nije (No, It's Not)
Ko ta čaša (Like That Glass)
Jer takva sam se rodila (Because I Was Born That Way)
Da sam muško (If I Were a Man)
Sve je laž (Everything Is a Lie)
Izdajice (Traitors)
Nemoj doći, ne (Do Not Come, No)
Idealno tvoja (Ideally Yours)

References

2002 debut albums
Seka Aleksić albums
Grand Production albums